Raja Kailas Pal Pathania (1313–1353 CE) was a King of Nurpur, who succeeded Raja Jas Pal as the chief of the Pathania Clan of Rajputs. He is accorded credit for wounding and defeating a famous Muslim General, Tatar Khan, who was a governor of Khorasan and who had invaded the Punjab. Kailas Pal received a reward of a Mansab of 5,000 Cavalry and Infantry from the Delhi Sultanate. Such a reward displayed that he was regarded as a powerful Chief and an important ally by the Delhi Sultanate. Most probably it refers to some local conflict between the Pathania King and Tatar Khan, the viceroy of the Punjab, under Muhammad bin Tughluq (1325–51). It took place previous to 1342 which was the year Tatar Khan was killed in a battle with the Gakhars. A couplet commemorating the battle between Kailas Pal and Tatar Khan has come down to our own time:

This Raja is said to have constructed the Ranki Khul or irrigation channel from the Ravi river to Pathankot, which is still in existence.

References
Feristha, Briggs, trans.,1908, Volume I
Twarikh Rajgan-E-Pathania-E-Nurpur (History of the Pathania Rajas) by Mian Rughunath Singh Pathania

14th-century Indian monarchs